Little Caesar Enterprises Inc. (doing business as Little Caesars) is an American multinational pizza chain. Based on 2020 statistics, Little Caesars is the third-largest pizza chain by total sales in the United States, behind Pizza Hut and Domino's Pizza. It operates and franchises pizza restaurants in the United States and internationally in Asia, the Middle East, Canada, Latin America and the Caribbean. The company was founded in 1959 and is based in Detroit, Michigan, headquartered in a newly-built annex of the Fox Theatre building in Downtown Detroit. Little Caesar Enterprises, Inc. is owned by Ilitch Holdings, which also owns the Detroit Tigers, who play across the street at Comerica Park, and the Detroit Red Wings, nearby at Little Caesars Arena.

History
Little Caesars Pizza was founded on May 8, 1959, by Mike Ilitch and his wife Marian Ilitch. The first location was in a strip mall in Garden City, Michigan, a suburb of Detroit, and named "Little Caesar's Pizza Treat". The original store closed in October 2018.

The first Little Caesar's franchise location opened in 1962 in Warren, Michigan, and at the time was still called Little Caesar's Pizza Treat. The same year the Little Caesar's logo became a 3D figure and was used in outdoor signage.

The company is famous for its advertising catchphrase "Pizza! Pizza!", which was introduced in 1979. The phrase refers to two pizzas being offered for the comparable price of a single pizza from competitors. Originally, the pizzas were served in a single long package (a piece of corrugated cardboard in 2-by-1 proportions, with two pizzas, placed side by side, then slid into a form-fitting paper sleeve that was folded and stapled closed). In 1988, they introduced a square deep-dish pizza called “Pan! Pan!”. Customers could purchase the “Pan! Pan!” pizzas as part of the 2-for-1 deal, or mix and match with one pan pizza and one original round pizza. Little Caesars has since discarded the unwieldy packaging in favor of typical pizza boxes. In addition to pizza with "exotic" toppings, they served hot dogs, chicken, shrimp, and fish.

Starting in 1997, the chain introduced shaker boards to advertise their "Hot-N-Ready Pizza", a large pepperoni pizza sold for $5. The concept was successful enough to become a permanent fixture of the chain, and Little Caesars' business model has shifted to focus more on carryout.

In 1998, Little Caesars filled what was then the largest pizza order, filling an order of 13,386 pizzas from the VF Corporation of Greensboro, North Carolina.

Little Caesars was among the first to use a new kind of speed-cooking conveyor oven, the "Rotary Air Impingement Oven".

On December 10, 2014, Little Caesars announced plans for a new eight-story, 205,000-square-foot Global Resource Center to be built at Woodward Avenue and Columbia Street in downtown Detroit. Intended to double the size of Little Caesars World Headquarters Campus, the new building's location was chosen near the Fox Office Center building, which houses both the Fox Theatre, and 186,000 square feet of office space for Little Caesars, and other Ilitch-affiliated ventures. An overhead pedestrian bridge over Columbia Street was planned to connect the Fox with the new Little Caesars Global Resource Center, and workspace for an additional 600 jobs to be brought to Detroit over time. On January 31, 2016, it was announced that the proposed new Little Caesars Pizza Global Resource Center had grown by one floor to be a nine-story building at Woodward and Columbia Street. The building was scheduled to be completed in 2018, but in October of that year, was pushed back due to construction delays.

In 2017, to coincide with the opening of Little Caesars Arena, the company launched a slightly updated logo, which removed Caesar's chest hair, updated the wreath, and updated the toga to have hidden letters spelling "LC" for "Little Caesars". The company also started using the updated Caesar in its advertising, replacing the more cartoonish Caesar that had been used in ads since the 1980s.

Corporate
Ilitch Holdings, Inc. manages professional services to companies owned by Marian Ilitch. These include the Detroit Red Wings of the National Hockey League (whose NHL arena, as of 2017, is named for the pizza chain), the Detroit Tigers of Major League Baseball, Blue Line Foodservice Distribution, Little Caesars Pizza Kits, Champion Foods, Olympia Entertainment, Olympia Development, Uptown Entertainment, the Hockeytown Cafe (also the site of City Theater), and the Fox Theatre in downtown Detroit.

Franchising

Little Caesars sold its first franchise in 1962 and, by 1987, had restaurants in all 50 states. Throughout the 1990s and early 2000s, Little Caesars were commonly found in Kmart stores, more specifically in Big Kmarts and Super Kmarts. Little Caesars pizza was also included in many older, remodeled Kmart locations. The first Kmart and the first Little Caesars were both built-in Garden City, Michigan. After Kmart's bankruptcy issues, many Kmarts replaced the Little Caesars with their own branded "K-Cafe". However, as of 2021, one Little Caesars Kmart location remains in Guam.

Between 2008 and 2015, Little Caesars was the fastest-growing pizza chain in the United States. , the company has 5,463 locations including U.S. and international units.

The estimated total investment necessary to begin the operation of a Little Caesars Franchise ranges from $378,700 to $1,695,500.

International growth
By 1987, the company was operating across the Northern United States, purchasing the Mother's Pizza chain out of receivership in Canada, the United States, and the United Kingdom in 1989. As of 2022, the company is present in Canada (some Canadian cities had locations since 1969), Honduras, Nicaragua, Costa Rica, Dominican Republic, Mexico, Colombia, Panama, Peru, the Philippines, Turkey, Jordan, Egypt, Guatemala, Barbados, Bahamas, Saudi Arabia, El Salvador, Jamaica, Bahrain, Trinidad and Tobago, Chile, Spain, Singapore, Russia and India.

The Little Caesars brand in the Philippines was present since the 1990s but gradually closed down in the 2000s. It reentered the market 25 January 2019, with its launching under a new franchisee and new branch in Ermita, Manila. Due to the COVID-19 pandemic, this lone branch has been since closed.

In 2019, Little Caesars restaurants in Australia closed their doors and went into administration, having entered the Australian market in 2014.

Little Caesars entered the Indian market on January 29, 2020, opening two stores in Ahmedabad, Gujarat.

Products
Little Caesars produces a variety of pizzas. Several core menu items are part of the HOT-N-READY menu, designed to make popular items available for immediate carry-out, while others are considered either specialty pizzas or custom pizzas. In 2013, they added the Deep! Deep! Dish Pizza, a Detroit-style pizza, to the menu.

Additional entrée options include flavored Caesar Wings and bread, such as Crazy Bread and Italian Cheese Bread. Select locations offer salads. All Little Caesars locations carry Pepsi products.

In 1996, they introduced Pizza by the Foot, which was a three-foot-long rectangular pizza. The product has since been discontinued; however, its equivalent Pizza by the Meter has been sold in the Saudi Arabian market since the 90s and is a very popular product. On occasion, Little Caesars releases limited time offers. In 2014, they introduced the Soft Pretzel Crust Pizza, and in 2015, the "Bacon Wrapped Deep! Deep! Dish Pizza."

In May 2019, Little Caesars began testing a pizza with meatless sausage made by Impossible Foods.

In June 2020, Little Caesars reintroduced Stuffed Crazy Bread. They first introduced it in 1995. The original Crazy Bread was first introduced in 1982.

Sponsorships
In September 2022, Little Caesars became the Official Pizza Sponsor of the National Football League.

Community programs

Love Kitchen
The Little Caesars Love Kitchen is a kitchen on wheels that serves pizza to those in need. Former Presidents Bill Clinton and George H. W. Bush recognized the Love Kitchen by awarding Little Caesars with The President's Volunteer Action Award Citation.

Veterans Program
In 2006, Little Caesars started its Veterans Program, which provides incentives to honorably discharged veterans looking to open their own business when transitioning back to civilian life or seeking a career change. Mike Ilitch was inspired to start the program after hearing a story about a veteran, who lost both legs in the war, returning to civilian life.

See also
 List of pizza chains of the United States

References

External links
 

 
Pizza chains of the United States
Restaurants established in 1959
Restaurant chains in the United States
Fast-food chains of the United States
Companies based in Detroit
Pizza chains of Canada
Pizza franchises
1959 establishments in Michigan
Italian-American cuisine
Fast casual restaurants